Joseph Anthony Rossi (March 13, 1921 – February 20, 1999) was a professional baseball player. He played one season in Major League Baseball for the Cincinnati Reds in 1952, primarily as a catcher. He was born in Oakland, California.

In his lone major league season, Rossi served as backup to Reds' starting catcher Andy Seminick. He appeared in 55 games, hitting .221 (32-for-145) with one triple and one home run, driving in six runs and scoring 14 times while stealing a base.

Rossi also spent 14 years in the minor leagues between 1941 and 1956, also managing the Spokane Indians of the Northwest League in his last baseball season.

Rossi died in Oakland, California, at the age of 77.

Sources

Major League Baseball catchers
Cincinnati Reds players
Merced Bears players
Idaho Falls Russets players
Twin Falls Cowboys players
Sacramento Solons players
Tyler Trojans players
Waco Dons players
Shreveport Sports players
Tacoma Tigers players
Spokane Indians players
Portland Beavers players
Toronto Maple Leafs (International League) players
Wenatchee Chiefs players
Modesto Reds players
Minor league baseball managers
Baseball players from Oakland, California
Spokane Indians managers
American people of Italian descent
1921 births
1999 deaths